Velké Pavlovice is a town in Břeclav District in the South Moravian Region of the Czech Republic. It has about 3,100 inhabitants.

Geography
Most of the municipal territory lies the Ždánice Forest range, only the southern part extends into the Lower Morava Valley and Kyjov Hills. The Trkmanka River flows through the territory.

History
The first written mention of Velké Pavlovice is from 1252, when the settlement gave tithes from vineyards to the newly founded Cistercian abbey in Žďár nad Sázavou. It frequently changed its owners. During the Thirty Years' War, Velké Pavlovice was one of the worst damaged villages in the region. The village recovered in the first half of the 18th century.

In 1891 Velké Pavlovice was promoted to a market town by Emperor Franz Joseph. In 1967, it became a town.

Demographics

Economy
The area of Velké Pavlovice is famous for its viticulture. It gave its name to the Velkopavlovická wine subregion.

Transport
The D2 motorway from Brno to the border with Slovakia runs next to the town.

Sights

The landmark of Velké Pavlovice is the Church of the Assumption of the Virgin Mary. It is an early Baroque church built in 1670–1680 and rebuilt in the mid-19th century.

Notable people
Rudolf Kassner (1873–1959), Austrian writer and philosopher

Twin towns — sister cities

Velké Pavlovice is twinned with:
 Échenon, France
 Senica, Slovakia
 Ždírec nad Doubravou, Czech Republic

References

External links

Cities and towns in the Czech Republic
Populated places in Břeclav District